LMF also known as Lazy Mutha Fucka or Lazy Muthafucka, is a Cantonese hip-hop group in Hong Kong. The group, signed by Warner Music, was founded in 1993, disbanded in 2003 and regrouped in 2009. Some members of LMF are pursuing solo careers.

In contrast with the norm of commercialized and packaged Cantopop at the time, LMF writes and perform their original music. All members of the group hailed from poverty and their songs often depict life and struggle in the underclass and working class; which created a lot of controversies due to the cursing and the subject matter.  They are ostracized by the mainstream media for a variety of reasons; among them, their perceived negative influence on Hong Kong youth, their promotion of the hip-hop attitude, and their rough appearance that contrasted the normally well-dressed and clean-cut performers in the  music industry.

LMF offers Hong Kong an alternative to Cantopop. LMF remains one of the few, if not the only, well-known localized rap groups. LMF highlights the economic oppression and social alienation faced by the lower class of Hong Kong, all coming from Hong Kong's overcrowded public housing.

LMF's attempt to establish a foothold in the highly commercialized and monopolized Hong Kong music industry is widely considered to be a success despite achieving only moderate commercial sales, due to their longevity, their name recognition (mostly due to negative press), and the original form of music they created.  They have a small but die-hard fan base in Hong Kong and Southeast Asia.

Their last and final album, finalazy, was released just before their breakup in 2003.

LMF reformed in December 2009, 10 years after their debut release and organized the "Wild Lazy Tour". "The Wild Lazy Tour" included venues in Singapore and Hong Kong.

Early years

LMF was founded in 1992 by Cheung Yee Sic (張以式), nicknamed Ar Sik (亞式). Cheng was the founder and organizer of "Dark Entry", an annual rock concert featuring local underground bands. Initially, Cheng named his band  重金屬同學會(translation: Heavy Metal Students Association) and gave it an English name: Lazy Mother Fuckers.

Initially LMF was merely a banner under which musicians from different bands got together and played; it did not have set members and there was no intent to create original music.  Cheng called the group more of a club than a band. At the finale of each Dark Entry concert, members of various bands that had performed that night would join together on stage and jam and perform under this loosely formed band, often fifteen or more players.  Musicians from many talented Hong Kong bands - including Anodize, Zig Zag, Zenith, Fraina and Martyr - have at one time or another lent members to LMF at the Dark Entry concert.

Dark Entry lasted a few years before financial problems led to its discontinuation.  With the disappearance of Dark Entry, Cheng and LMF also went into hiatus.

The Revival

In 1996, an unknown young DJ from Hong Kong shocked many by defeating several favourites and taking second place in the DMC World Championship.  DJ Tommy's accomplishment caught the attention of Hong Kong music executives and soon the young DJ received financing to release a six-song self-titled album.  DJ Tommy solicited veteran underground rapper and graffiti artist MC Yan to be a guest vocalist.  The release created minor controversy with slight cursing in one of the songs but sales overall was disappointing in a market dominated by commercialized Cantopop.  However, the collaboration between DJ Tommy and MC Yan went so well that they decided to form a band.

MC Yan had just left his longtime band N.T. (New Territory) over creative differences (he wanted to incorporate hip hop into their music while his bandmates wanted to play strictly speed metal).  A well known and respected artist in the indie music circle, MC Yan had no trouble recruiting some of the best talent in Hong Kong: lead guitarist Kee (from the band Screw), rhythm guitarist Prodip, drummer Kevin, vocalists Kit and Phat.

Around this time heavy metal band Anodize, the most popular yet financially struggling indie band in Hong Kong decided to call it quits.  All band members intended to retire from the music scene until they were approached by MC Yan and DJ Tommy, who were hoping to recruit Jimmy to play bass but were delighted when lead singer Wah and drummer/guitarist/keyboardist Davy decided to join too.  A fourth Anodize member, Gary, joined the band as a part-time member.  The addition of Anodize's former members added gravitas and musicianship to a group already loaded with talent. MC Yan decided to adopt the LMF name and the band was formally formed in 1998.

It's unclear what role, if any, founder Cheung Yee Sik (張以式) played in LMF's revival. Most critics attribute MC Yan (lead singer of N.T.) and DJ Tommy for turning LMF into a mostly hip hop band, one that mixes rap with heavy metal/rock.

LMF dropped the Chinese name 重金屬同學會 and named themselves 大懶堂 (Lazy Hall).  The band's English name was altered from Lazy Mother Fuckers to Lazy Mutha Fucka.

LMF became stabilised with set members instead of having a "revolving door". MC Yan still held that he considers LMF more of a community than an actual band. He also said he's amazed at the smoothness of the creative process given the input of so many members. He attributes their creative success to all members sharing a vision of where they want to take their music.  
The ten full-time members and two part-time members are:

Full-time members: 
MC Yan (vocal)
Kit (vocal)
Phat (vocal)
Wah (vocal)
DJ Tommy (turntable)
Davy (drum and guitar)
Kevin (drum)
Jimmy (bass guitar)
Kee (guitar)
Prodip (guitar)

Part-time members:
Gary (guitar / bass guitar)
Sam (vocal)

20th anniversary festival
In 2019, the band announced a 20th anniversary festival on 28–29 December, called LMFXXYEARFEST, featuring Matt Force, Dough Boy, Future, Seanie, Tommy, KZ, Akiko, JB, 黃禍, Heyo, Phoon, Josie and The Uni Boys, R.O.O.T, 逆流 and My Little Airport.

Music
In the late nineties, LMF played at various clubs and generated a lot of buzz in the indie music scene. They released their self-titled debut album in 1998 under their own label - A.Room Production ("A Room Studio" is the name of the studio where they recorded the album. It's also the location where Anodize, Screw, and N.T. recorded before they joined LMF). The album features six songs and sold almost 100,000 copies worldwide, an unheard-of feat for a Hong Kong indie band without backing from a major label. In 1999, they signed with Warner Music HK's independent label - DNA.

Due to the band having so many members across different genres, LMF's music can be best described as a diverse and coherent mix of hip hop, rock and thrash metal, with occasional funk or even reggae thrown in.  The genius lies in their ability to seamlessly mesh together all genres. For example, "傲氣長存" features a thrash metal-like intro, evolves into a funk beat, turns into a brief hip hop mix before returning to the funk beat with rap vocal. The chorus is thrash metal with singing vocal and the interlude is speed metal with heavy guitar muting and rap vocal on top.

The song 大懶堂 (Lazy Hall), using a hypothetical aftermath of winning the lottery as a backdrop to critique Hong Kong's competitive and stressful environment, struck a chord with the listening audience and is arguably the band's most popular hit.  However, LMF made no attempt to follow up 大懶堂's commercial success with similar radio-friendly songs, preferring to explore their music in new directions.

Unlike most acts in the Hong Kong industry, LMF retain total control of their music creation (under their agreement with the music label) and LMF said they are not under pressure to produce commercial hits nor would they have succumbed to such pressure if it was present.

Controversy
LMF represents the youth culture and attitudes in Hong Kong. They have a subtle but great influence on Hong Kong popular culture.

The title of one of their most popular songs, "" (Hum Ga Ling), is one of the strongest curses in Cantonese mingled with English phrases like "You know what the fuck I'm sayin~" . In English, "Hum Ga Ling" literally means "Put one's entire family into hell (or death)". The song is packed with swearing in Cantonese and English. Since the public response of Hong Kong to the media was and is still very conservative, LMF continued to remain low key, though they were well received underground.

The emergence of LMF has also received HKEAA's attention. In 1999 HKASL Chinese & Chinese Culture Paper II (Cultural Problems), candidates have been asked to comment on the statement "Foul Songs Display True Art".

Culture
Behind the profanity of "" lies a deeper message. Another popular song by LMF, "1127", is a tribute to Bruce Lee. The song encourages young Chinese to take pride in their rich Chinese ancestry, culture, and history, instead of pretending to be like the Westerners. Notable lines from the lyrics include:

A documentary about the band, Dare Ya! (Cantonese title: 大你), is based around interviews with the various band members.

Politics and society

The group put much effort into expressing their discontent with the political and economic turmoil in Hong Kong, such as the Asian financial crisis, as well as the incompetence of the Hong Kong political leaders, as demonstrated through the song "WTF". They also attempted to reinforce a distinct and unique Hong Kong cultural identity in which the youth of Hong Kong should be proud of as illustrated in the song "1127" taking Bruce Lee as a Chinese role model.

Many of LMF's songs reflected the cultural problem of having a lack of an identity for today's youth to look up to and be proud of in the modern Hong Kong society. In their song "債" (Debt), they stated that many Chinese parents send their children to the opposite side of the world only to have them grow up to be "Caucasians with yellow skin" (Cantonese lyrics: "") while the parents have distanced themselves with their children and are not assuming the responsibilities of raising them.

LMF often criticise Hong Kong's music culture. They said in the song "傲氣長存" and "樂壇班霸" that Hong Kong is no place for music, but rather entertainment in the form of scandals created by the paparazzi. They also criticise producers inability to make good music in a line that translates roughly as "if you don't fucking know how to be creative, then don't be so conceited."

In the song "冚家拎", the majority of the song criticised Hong Kong's corrupt society. They accused the paparazzi of making up fake news and publishing subjective opinions to sell their newspapers and magazines. They also expressed anger toward adult content and illegal gambling contents (soccer betting) found in newspapers.

Television appearances
In 2000, beer brewer San Miguel Corporation terminated their contract with Hong Kong movie star Tony Leung Ka Fai and signed LMF to star in six different commercials for the beer company. The commercials ran during Christmas and Lunar New Year. The song "Para Salud" was recorded to air in the beer commercial, which was also in their album LMFAMiGLiA.

Trivia
 The beginning of WTF on Finalazy samples Shirley Bassey's theme song for the 1971 James Bond film, Diamonds Are Forever.
 In the song "Thank You", one of the people thanked is 亞式, the original founder of LMF.
 Popular artist Michael Lau released several series of collectable vinyl figures based on some members of LMF. The "Crazy Children" is a line of collectable Lau figures that includes Davy, Prodip, MC Yan and DJ Tommy.  "Crazy Children" is also the name of a song on LMF's "Crazy Children" album. Lau also designed some of the album covers and posters for LMF and are close friends with several of the LMF members.

Discography

Albums
The Ultimate s...Hits
LMFsHits Greatest Hits 2CD
Finalazy
LMF Videophile
L.M.F.CRAZYCHILDREN [2nd version]
L.M.F.CRAZYCHILDREN
the realazy mofo. DBF
Respect For Da Chopstick Hip Hop
LMFAMiGLiA LIVE
LMFAMiGLiA
Lazy Family 大懶堂
Lazy Family 大懶堂 EP
Gardener VS LazyMuthaFucka
LazyMuthaFucka [Taiwan version]
LazyMuthaFucka
HMA - The Latest Independence Music Of HK 自主音樂圖鑑 track 09 "同床"
DJ Tommy - Scratch Rider
DJ Tommy - Scratch Rider
Dj Tommy-Respect 4 Da Chopstick HipHop
Anodize - Anodize 4
The Explosive Original Sound Track Gen-X Cops track 02 "XXXX"
William So - 蘇永康的化粧間 track 07 "詐唔知"
Ronald Cheng - One More TimeAroom RepresentsDisbanding and Reunion
LMF disbanded in 2003 mainly due to insufficient income. The reason for this was because they had too many members, with usually 10 in each concert, and the difficulty of acceptance of their music by the general public as their songs are somewhat controversial. They are now pursuing their own solo careers and new bands.  Kit and Phat have formed 24HERBS, a rap group.  Phat is also the lead singer of punk rock band, Hardpack, with Kevin on the drums.  MC Yan has helped Edison Chen on several of his albums, making hip-hop and rap more accessible to mainstream audiences.  On the underground side, MC Yan has been working with several MCs and has formed a new group, Yellow Peril. Davy is DBF and still active in the music scene, most notably as a drummer in various concerts for Eason Chan. Mc Yan also the founder of 福建音樂 Fu©Kin Music.

After a 6-year hiatus, LMF returned to the music scene again in 2009 to release one new single Clutching the Middle Finger'' (揸緊中指) reflecting the increasing anger of the contemporary youth at the incompetence of the establishment and the increasing lack of social mobility for young people.

References

External links
 Warner Music Taiwan: LMF
 MC Yan official blog
 DJ Tommy official website
 Article on LMF Source: Asiaweek.com
  Discography and songs
 Lyrics
   interview with member Prodip (sound & video)
 MC Yan Interview with Alchemy SBS Radio 2008
 LMF Alive Not Dead Website
 Wild Lazy Tour

Hong Kong hip hop groups
Chinese rappers
Musical groups established in 1993
Musical groups disestablished in 2003
Musical groups reestablished in 2009